Rupesh KC (born 13 May 1991 in Kathmandu, Nepal) is a Nepali footballer. He plays for Manang Marshyangdi Club in Nepal National League as a midfielder. He also played for Nepal in the 2009 Nehru Cup.

Club career 
Rupesh KC was born in Kathmandu. He started his career after spending a year at the ANFA academy before joining the Yeti Himalayan Sherpa Club for two years. He latter moved on to the Manang Marshyangdi Club.

On 2 July 2015 KC signed a monthlong loan deal with CFC Bhutan, with the option of a second month. KC is joined by fellow MMC player Sujal Shrestha as well as Surendra Thapa of Morang XI. The players will each be paid 64,000 rupees a month.

International career 
Rupesh KC played for Nepal at the U-13, U-14, U-19, and U-22 levels.

He was included for the squad for the 2009 Nehru Cup, playing in the first two games but his tournament was cut short by an eye infection.

Personal life 
Rupesh KC has a part-time job of an actor-model. In February 2015, he did a music video with famed Nepalese actress Priyanka Karki.

References

External links 
 Rupesh KC Goal.com profile
 
 
 

1984 births
Living people
Sportspeople from Kathmandu
Association football midfielders
Nepalese footballers
Manang Marshyangdi Club players
Expatriate footballers in Bhutan
Nepalese expatriate sportspeople in Bhutan
Nepalese expatriate footballers
Nepal international footballers
Nepalese male models
Nepalese male actors